Brian Patrick Schlitter (born December 21, 1985) is an American professional baseball pitcher for the Chicago Dogs of the American Association of Professional Baseball. He has played in Major League Baseball (MLB) for the Chicago Cubs and Oakland Athletics, and in Nippon Professional Baseball (NPB) for the Saitama Seibu Lions.

Career
Prior to playing professionally, he attended Maine South High School and then the College of Charleston. He was originally drafted in the 34th round of the 2005 amateur draft by the Los Angeles Angels of Anaheim, however he did not sign.

Philadelphia Phillies
Schliter was next drafted in the 16th round of the 2007 amateur draft by the Philadelphia Phillies, and signed with them. He began his professional career in 2007, splitting the season between the Williamsport Crosscutters (one game) and Lakewood BlueClaws (16 games). That season he went a combined 0-1 with a 3.51 ERA in 17 relief appearances. In 2008, Schlitter pitched for the Clearwater Threshers in the Phillies organization, going 4-3 with a 2.22 ERA in 34 relief appearances with them.

Chicago Cubs
On August 7, 2008, Schlitter was traded to the Chicago Cubs in exchange for pitcher Scott Eyre. He finished the season with the Daytona Cubs, going 0-1 with a 2.16 ERA in seven relief appearances. Overall, he went 4-4 with a 2.21 ERA in 41 relief appearances, striking out 67 batters in 57 innings. Schlitter spent all of 2009 with the Tennessee Smokies, going 1-7 with a 4.38 ERA in 59 relief appearances. He began 2010 with the Triple-A Iowa Cubs, with whom he went 1-1 with a 4.09 ERA in 27 relief appearances prior to his call up to the major leagues.

On June 28, 2010, he made his major league debut. He pitched 2/3 of an inning against the Pittsburgh Pirates, striking out both batters he faced.

The Cubs placed Schlitter on the 15-day DL with a right shoulder impingement on July 7, 2010. Schlitter was optioned back to Triple A on August 3, 2010, a day after hitting Milwaukee Brewers center fielder Carlos Gómez on the head with a pitch. He finished his rookie year with a 12.38 ERA in 7 appearances.

On January 5, 2011, Schlitter was claimed off waivers by the New York Yankees. On February 14, 2011, Schlitter was designated for assignment by the Yankees. Schlitter claimed off waivers by the Philadelphia Phillies on February 15. On April 18, 2011, Schlitter was returned to the Cubs. The commissioner's office returned him to the Cubs from the Phillies because of a past elbow injury.

He split the 2012 season Double-A Tennessee Smokies and Daytona, posting a 2.61 ERA in 50 appearances. The next year, Schlitter logged a 2.42 ERA in 54 appearances between Iowa and Tennessee. In 2014, Schlitter was invited to Spring Training as a non-roster invitee. On March 29, the Cubs announced that he had made the 2014 major league opening day roster. Schlitter earned his first career MLB win on May 3, 2014, against the St. Louis Cardinals. He finished the year with a 2-3 record and 4.15 ERA across 61 appearances.

Schlitter did not make the Opening Day roster in 2015 and was assigned to Iowa to begin the year. Schlitter struggled to a 7.36 ERA in 10 major league appearances and was designated for assignment on August 27, 2015. He was assigned outright to Iowa, where he finished the season, and elected free agency on October 14.

Colorado Rockies
On November 18, 2015, Schlitter signed a minor league contract with the Colorado Rockies organization that included an invitation to Spring Training. He did not make the club out of spring and was assigned to the Triple-A Albuquerque Isotopes to begin the year. He spent the season in Albuquerque, pitching to a 3.64 ERA with 43 strikeouts in 42.0 innings of work. On October 26, 2016, Schlitter was released by the Rockies.

Saitama Seibu Lions
On November 10, 2016, Schlitter signed with the Saitama Seibu Lions of Nippon Professional Baseball. Schlitter fared well in Japan, logging a 2.83 ERA with 23 strikeouts in 64 appearances. He became a free agent after the 2017 season.

Los Angeles Dodgers
On February 13, 2018, Schlitter signed a minor league contract with the Los Angeles Dodgers. He pitched in 58 games for the AAA Oklahoma City Dodgers, with a 7–2 record, 3.36 ERA and 21 saves. On November 2, 2018, he elected free agency.

Oakland Athletics
On November 15, 2018, Schlitter signed a minor league deal with the Oakland Athletics. He was assigned to the Triple-A Las Vegas Aviators to begin the 2019 season. On June 23, 2019, his contract was selected by the A's. On July 29, he was designated for assignment after logging a 3.72 ERA in 6 games. He finished the year in Triple-A and elected free agency on October 1. He re-signed with the A's on November 25, 2019. However, Schlitter did not play in a game in 2020 due to the cancellation of the minor league season because of the COVID-19 pandemic. On November 2, 2020, Schlitter again re-signed with Oakland on a new minor league contract. Schlitter recorded a 9.00 ERA in 5 games for Triple-A Las Vegas before being released on May 23, 2021.

Seattle Mariners
On May 26, 2021, Schlitter signed a minor league contract with the Seattle Mariners organization. He elected free agency on November 7, 2021.

Guerreros de Oaxaca
On May 4, 2022, Schlitter signed with the Guerreros de Oaxaca of the Mexican League. In 13 appearances, he posted a 3–2 record with a 8.49 ERA and 6 strikeouts over 11.2 innings. Schlitter was released on June 6, 2022.

Chicago Dogs
On June 15, 2022, Schlitter signed with the Chicago Dogs of the American Association of Professional Baseball.

References

External links

1985 births
Living people
Águilas de Mexicali players
American expatriate baseball players in Mexico
American expatriate baseball players in Japan
Arizona League Cubs players
Baseball players from Illinois
Chicago Cubs players
Clearwater Threshers players
College of Charleston Cougars baseball players
Daytona Cubs players
Iowa Cubs players
Lake City Timberwolves baseball players
Lakewood BlueClaws players
Las Vegas Aviators players
Major League Baseball pitchers
Nippon Professional Baseball pitchers
Oakland Athletics players
Oklahoma City Dodgers players
People from Chicago
Sportspeople from Oak Park, Illinois
Saitama Seibu Lions players
Senadores de San Juan players
Tacoma Rainiers players
Tennessee Smokies players
Williamsport Crosscutters players